The Soviet War Memorial is one of several war memorials in Berlin, the capital city of Germany, erected by the Soviet Union to commemorate its war dead, particularly the 80,000 soldiers of the Soviet Armed Forces who died during the Battle of Berlin in April and May 1945.

The memorial is located in the Großer Tiergarten, a large public park to the west of the city centre, on the north side of the east–west Straße des 17. Juni (17 June Street) in the Tiergarten locality.

Site

This memorial was erected in 1945, within a few months of the capture of the city. Early photographs show the memorial standing in a wilderness of ruins, the Tiergarten having been destroyed by incendiary bombs and then stripped of timber for firewood during the last months of the war. Today, it is surrounded by the extensive woodlands of the reconstituted Tiergarten. Although the memorial stood in the British sector of Berlin, its construction was supported by all the Allied Powers. Throughout the Cold War, Soviet 6th Separate Guards Motor Rifle Brigade honor guards from East Berlin were sent to stand watch at the memorial.

Design

The memorial was built from stonework taken from the destroyed Reich Chancellery. Built in a style similar to other Soviet World War II monuments that were once found all over the former Eastern Bloc, the memorial takes the form of a curved stoa topped by a large statue of a Soviet soldier. It is set in landscaped gardens and flanked by two Red Army ML-20 152mm gun-howitzer artillery pieces and two T-34 tanks. Behind the memorial is an outdoor museum showing photographs of the memorial's construction and giving a guide to other memorials in the Berlin area.

A large inscription in Russian is written underneath the soldier statue, which is translated as "Eternal glory to heroes who fell in battle with the German fascist invaders for the freedom and independence of the Soviet Union". The Soviets built the statue with the soldier's arm in a position to symbolize the Red Army's putting down of the Nazi German state. According to the Visit Berlin 2018 website, the statue's left arm and hand were actually to stretch out over the graves of more than 2000 soldiers, not to symbolise the putting down of the Nazi state.

The memorial was designed by architect Mikhail Gorvits with the monument of the Soviet soldier by sculptors Vladimir Tsigal and Lev Kerbel.

The memorial today

The memorial is still a site of active commemoration. On the anniversary of VE Day, (8 May), wreath-laying ceremonies are held at the memorial. It is a site of pilgrimage for war veterans from the countries of the former Soviet Union. It is also a popular tourist attraction since it is much closer to the centre of the city than the larger Soviet war memorial at Treptower Park. The memorial is maintained by the City of Berlin.

There is a sign next to the monument explaining in English, German and Russian that this is the burial site of some 2,000 fallen Soviet soldiers. It is located in the heart of Berlin along one of the major roads with a clear sight of the Reichstag and the Brandenburg Gate, both symbols of the city. Some of the marble used to build it came from the destroyed government buildings nearby, and it is built on a place which Adolf Hitler meant to devote to Welthauptstadt Germania. Besides the main inscription, the columns state names of only some dead Heroes of the Soviet Union buried here.

The monument is built in the British sector of West Berlin; after the Berlin Wall was erected in 1961, the monument was seen as a sign of communist provocation on West Berlin soil and had to be protected from West Berliners by British Army Berlin Infantry Brigade soldiers. In 1970 a neo-Nazi, Ekkehard Weil, shot and severely wounded one of the Soviet honour guards at the monument. In 2010, the monument was vandalized just before Victory in Europe Day celebrations with red graffiti that read "thieves, murderers, rapists", sparking a protest from the Russian Embassy in Berlin that accused German authorities of not taking sufficient measures to protect the monument. The German tabloid Bild launched a Bundestag-petition to remove the Soviet tanks from the memorial site as a response to the Crimean crisis in 2014, calling them a "martial war symbol". The petition was subsequently denied by the German federal government, which iterated that it would honor the 1990 Treaty on the Final Settlement with Respect to Germany requiring it to maintain Soviet war memorials.

In popular culture
The monument is featured in the 1989 Cold War thriller The Package.

The monument and its tanks are a background feature of Rory's jet-lagged run in Tom Hanks' short story "A Junket in the City of Light".

See also
 Soviet War Memorial (Vienna)
 Soviet War Memorial (Schönholzer Heide)

References

External links

 Visit Berlin: Soviet Memorial Tiergarten
 
 Aviewoncities.com page

1945 sculptures
Buildings and structures completed in 1945
Buildings and structures in Mitte
Heritage sites in Berlin
Monuments and memorials in Berlin
Soviet military memorials and cemeteries in Germany
Tiergarten (park)